In the anatomy of the brain, the centromedian nucleus, also known as the centrum medianum,  (CM or Cm-Pf) is a part of the intralaminar thalamic nuclei (ITN) in the thalamus. There are two centromedian nuclei arranged bilaterally.

In humans, it contains about 2000 neurons per cubic millimetre and has a volume of about 310 cubic millimetres with 664,000 neurons in total.

Input and output
It sends nerve fibres to the subthalamic nucleus and putamen. It receives nerve fibres from the cerebral cortex, vestibular nuclei, globus pallidus, superior colliculus, reticular formation, and spinothalamic tract.

Function
Its physiological role involves attention and arousal, including control of the level of cortical activity. Some frequencies of extracellular electrical stimulation of the centromedian nucleus can cause absence seizures (temporary loss of consciousness) although electrical stimulation can be of therapeutic use in intractable epilepsy and Tourette's syndrome. Specifically, centromedian nucleus has been proposed to be a target for neuromodulation-based treatment of generalized epilepsy. General anaesthetics specifically suppress activity in the ILN, including the centromedian nucleus. Complete bilateral lesions of the centromedian nucleus can lead to states normally associated with brain death such as coma, death, persistent vegetative state, forms of mutism and severe delirium. Unilateral lesions can lead to unilateral thalamic neglect.

A patient with electrodes implanted into more than 50 different regions in his brain (including regions giving him orgasmic feelings) choose to self stimulate the electrode in his centromedian nucleus more than all other electrodes. The patients explanation of this:  "The subject reported that he was almost able to recall a memory during this stimulation, but he could not quite grasp it. The frequent selfstimulations were an endeavor to bring this elusive memory into clear focus."

Additional images

Notes and references

External links
 - The Global Thalamus (See level 12, the centromedian nucleus is labelled CM)
 
Joe Bogen's Consciousness Page (Professor Bogen) at California Institute of Technology
 NIF Search - Centromedian Nucleus via the Neuroscience Information Framework

Thalamic nuclei